Gamja-jeon or potato pancakes is a variety of jeon, or Korean style pancake, made by pan-frying finely grated potato on a frying pan with any type of vegetable oil until golden brown.

History
Potatoes may have been introduced in Korea either through the China–North Korea border at Tumen in 1824, or by the German missionary Karl Gützlaff via sea in 1832. The tubers have been cultivated mainly in the hills and mountain ranges of Gangwon Province, with gamjajeon becoming a specialty of that region. Gamjajeon is traditionally made with only potato, salt, and oil.

Ingredients

According to taste, the grated potato may be supplemented with finely shredded potatoes, carrots, onions or scallions, sliced mushrooms, or garlic chives, which adds color and crunchy texture to the dish. Gamjajeon can also be garnished with shredded fresh red and green chili pepper. It is served with a dipping sauce called choganjang (초간장), made of soy sauce and vinegar.

Photos

See also
 Potato pancake
 Rösti
 Potato cake
 Pajeon
 Bindaetteok
 Boxty
 Kimchi

References

External links
Recipe

Korean pancakes
Potato pancakes